Gejia may refer to:

Gejia language, a Miao language of Huangping County, Guizhou, China
Gejia people, an ethnic group found in Guizhou province, China